161 Athor is an M-type Main belt asteroid that was discovered by James Craig Watson on April 19, 1876, at the Detroit Observatory and named after Hathor, an Egyptian fertility goddess. It is the namesake of a proposed Athor asteroid family, estimated to be ~3 billion years old.

This result is consistent with previous determinations. The spectra is similar to that of carbonaceous chondrites, with characteristics of ferric oxides and little or no hydrated minerals.

References

External links 
 
 

000161
Discoveries by James Craig Watson
Named minor planets
000161
000161
18760419